Josephine Mugerwa (at times called Phina Mugerwa and commonly known as Phina Masanyalaze), is a Ugandan singer and dancer who is also hailed "Uganda's Shakira"

Early life and education
Phina Mugerwa was born the fourth of the five children to Francis Kiwanuka and Annet Komugisha in 1984 in Kawaala, neighbourhood of Kampala. She attended Namirembe Kindergarten and Namirembe Infants Primary School for primary education before joining St Andrew's Kaggwa and Daniel Secondary School and Springfield College for her O Levels (UCE) and A levels (UACE) respectively

Music
Mugerwa started her music career in 2007 after completing her senior six. Radio presenter Kato Lubwama had announced on the radio that he was seeking dancers to join his Diamonds Ensemble Band. She auditioned with about 300 others and was among the three that were chosen. She is famous for both her dancing and her singing. Her songs like Bampassudde and Gyobera have made her a household name in Uganda's music industry.

Discography

Songs

 Kwepikira
 Gyogenda
 Tinkula
 Lwaaki Ondaza
 Nze wuuyo
 Omuferere
 Bampassudde

Awards
 PAM Award for Best New Artist, 2006

Personal life
She has a son.

References

External links
"Cindy Blasts Phina Mugerwa: I Didn’t Snatch Your Man"
"Pam awards 2011 launched"
"Ugandan musicians and who they are like"

21st-century Ugandan women singers
Living people
Kumusha
1984 births